Scott Krotee (born February 20, 1990) is a former American professional soccer player.

Career

Youth & College
Krotee played NCAA Division 1 soccer at Gardner–Webb University between 2008 and 2012. Notably, Krotee was selected to the 2011 Big South Soccer All-Tournament Team, finished 5th in the nation in total saves in 2012, and finished his career as the all-time career leader in goals against average at Gardner–Webb University, among many things.

While in college, Krotee appeared for Philadelphia Union's Official Player Development Partner, USL PDL club, Reading United AC.

Prior to college, Krotee spent three seasons with Reading United AC's U-20 club from 2006–09. From 2002-2004, he was a member of the Olympic Development Program First Team (USA EPYSA).

Professional
Upon graduating from Gardner–Webb University, Krotee signed with the Major Indoor Soccer League's Pennsylvania Roar for the 2013/14 season. After 9 appearances, Krotee was selected to the 2013/14 Major Indoor Soccer League's All-Rookie Team for his performance.  Krotee then signed with MLS's Columbus Crew USL Pro affiliate club Dayton Dutch Lions on June 2, 2014. After the conclusion of the 2014 USL Pro season, Krotee moved back indoor and signed his 3rd professional contract with the Major Arena Soccer League's Harrisburg Heat on November 21, 2014 for the 2014/15 season. During this time, Krotee was added to the "Projected Top 100 American Goalkeepers" for the 2018 World Cup. On November 25, 2015 Krotee re-signed for the Harrisburg Heat for the 2015/16 season.

References

1990 births
Living people
American soccer players
Reading United A.C. players
Dayton Dutch Lions players
Association football goalkeepers
Soccer players from Pennsylvania
USL League Two players
USL Championship players